The 100-kilometer race walk is a racewalking event.  The event is competed as a road race. Athletes must always keep in contact with the ground and the supporting leg must remain straight until the raised leg passes it.  100 kilometers is 62.14 miles.

History

Against the wishes of the Israeli track and field authorities, because the Munich Massacre had just taken place, Israel Shaul Ladany competed and won the gold medal in the World 100 km walking title at the 1972 World Championships in Switzerland, in a time of 9:31:00.

U.S. record
The United States record is 9:36:33, set by Dan Pierce in Houston, Texas, on December 2, 1987.

References

Racewalking distances